Alfred Edward Marks OBE (born Alfred Edward Touchinsky; 28 January 19211 July 1996) was a British actor and comedian. In his 60-year career, he played dramatic and comedy roles in numerous television programmes, stage shows and films. His self-titled television sketch show ran from 1956 to 1961.

Biography
Marks was born as Alfred Edward Touchinsky in Holborn, London, to Polish Jewish parents. He left Bell Lane School at 14 and started in entertainment at the Windmill Theatre. He then served in the RAF as a Flight Sergeant in the Middle East where he arranged concerts for servicemen. He also worked as an auctioneer and engineer.

He started in variety at the Kilburn Empire in 1946, and his stage appearances included The Sunshine Boys and Fiddler on the Roof. He also did comedy work with Peter Sellers and Harry Secombe which later led to the formation (along with writer Spike Milligan) of The Goon Show, though Marks did not become a member.

His films included The Frightened City, Scream and Scream Again and Our Miss Fred. His television show, Alfred Marks Time, ran for 6 years on ITV. He compered Sunday Night at the London Palladium and in 1966 he appeared as a narrator in five episodes of the BBC children's television show Jackanory. Marks also appeared in numerous other television programmes including The Good Old Days, The Sweeney, Blankety Blank, The Marti Caine Show, The Two Ronnies, The Generation Game, Lovejoy, Minder, Parkinson, The All New Alexei Sayle Show, The Persuaders! amongst others.

In 1965 he appeared in Bill Naughton's Spring & Port Wine at the Mermaid Theatre, London, playing Rafe, and in 1967, he toured Australia for J. C. Williamson Theatres in that play  In 1968, he played the lead in The Young Visiters, a musical version of the turn of the 20th century Daisy Ashford novel (written when she was nine and published as submitted by her with the spelling errors) at the Piccadilly Theatre in London. When he was the subject of This Is Your Life in December 1971, he was surprised by Eamonn Andrews at London's Garrick Theatre. Marks was a fine bass-baritone and appeared regularly on the BBC TV series 'The Good Old Days'. One of his most memorable renditions was of Kipling's 'The Road to Mandalay', in the version made famous by Peter Dawson. He appeared as "Wilfred Shadbolt" in a video production of the Gilbert and Sullivan opera The Yeomen of the Guard in 1982.

While on tour in Australia, Marks was appointed the second King of Moomba (1968) by the Melbourne Moomba festival committee. When asked what his qualifications were, he quipped (in full Cockney):

When I was eleven there were rival gangs around a fruit market in the East End. And desperately, I always wanted to be a member of the bigger rival gang. One day when I was in my best Easter suit, someone from one of the other gangs said to me 'would you like to be King of the Golden Apples?' 'All right, just sit there on this box and call out Apples, Apples, give me the Golden Apples.' Which innocently I did and they cobbled me with every rotten apple in the market.

Personal life
Marks married actress Paddie O'Neil in 1952. They remained together until his death. The couple had two children, Gareth (also an actor), and Danielle.

Selected filmography
 Penny Points to Paradise (1951) - Edward Haynes
 Johnny, You're Wanted (1956) - Marks
 Desert Mice (1959) - Poskett
 There Was a Crooked Man (1960) - Adolf Carter
 A Weekend with Lulu (1961) - Comte de Grenoble
 The Frightened City (1961) - Harry Foulcher
 She'll Have to Go (1962) - Douglas Oberon
 Scream and Scream Again (1970) - Detective Supt. Bellaver
 Scramble (1970) - Mr. Heppelwhite
 Hide and Seek (1972) - Butcher
 Our Miss Fred (1972) - General Brincker
 Valentino (1977) - Richard Rowland
 Fanny Hill (1983) - Lecher

References

External links
 

1921 births
1996 deaths
Male actors from London
English Jews
English male film actors
English male stage actors
English male television actors
People from Hillingdon
People from Holborn
Officers of the Order of the British Empire
20th-century English male actors
Freemasons of the United Grand Lodge of England
20th-century British male singers
Royal Air Force personnel of World War II
Royal Air Force airmen